Tomás Martin Baroni (born 25 May 1995) is an Argentine professional footballer who plays as a centre-back for Atlético de Rafaela.

Career
Baroni spent his early career years in Santa Fe with clubs Colón de San Justo and Unión Santa Fe. In 2016, he departed to join Argentine Primera División team Atlético de Rafaela. His first appearance on a Rafaela first-team teamsheet came when he was an unused substitute in the Copa Argentina versus Ferro Carril Oeste on 3 June 2016. Exactly one year later, Baroni made his top-flight professional debut in a match against Godoy Cruz, coming on as a substitute for Mathías Abero. His next two appearances came in Rafaela's final two fixtures of the 2016–17 campaign, a season that ended in relegation.

On 19 January 2020, Baroni joined Spanish Tercera División club Lorca Deportiva on loan until June 2021. He made his debut on 26 January in a win away to Muleño, which preceded a further seven appearances as Lorca were promoted; following the COVID-19 curtailment. He'd appear seven times in Segunda División B, before departing on 18 December 2020 after terminating his loan early. Baroni was sent off on three occasions during his time there, including twice across his final three games; versus UCAM Murcia and Numancia respectively, though did score against the latter in the Copa del Rey defeat.

Career statistics
.

References

External links

1995 births
Living people
Sportspeople from Santa Fe Province
Argentine footballers
Association football defenders
Argentine expatriate footballers
Expatriate footballers in Spain
Argentine expatriate sportspeople in Spain
Argentine Primera División players
Primera Nacional players
Tercera División players
Segunda División B players
Unión de Santa Fe footballers
Atlético de Rafaela footballers
CF Lorca Deportiva players